The Rachel Forster Hospital for Women and Children opened on 3 January 1922 
in Redfern (an inner suburb of Sydney, Australia) as the 'New Hospital'. In 1925 the hospital was renamed after Baroness Rachel Forster, the wife of the then Governor-General of Australia, Henry Forster, 1st Baron Forster.
Initial goals were to serve as a training hospital for female doctors and to serve women and children. It later grew to include specialised clinics and a breast cancer research centre.

The hospital started admitting men in 1967.

The hospital faced closure in the mid 1990s and services were transferred to Royal Prince Alfred Hospital by mid 2002.

In 2013, City of Sydney councillor Irene Doutney raised strong concerns about the proposed redevelopment of the site, suggesting that most of the hospital would be demolished apart from the eastern facade and the colonnades at the front entrance. She suggested that the hospital had been left to "demolition by neglect", and that in the new development "They’re going to keep the minimum amount of heritage possible then bang a new building down. It's not adaptive re-use at all, it's demolition."

In December 2014, The Daily Telegraph ran a photo piece documenting the deteriorating and vandalised state of the hospital despite its former significance, and referring to Doutney's 2013 concerns about the site falling victim to "demolition by neglect."

References

External links

  [CC-By-SA]

Defunct hospitals in Australia
Women's hospitals
Children's hospitals in Australia
Former hospitals in Sydney
1922 establishments in Australia
2002 disestablishments in Australia
Hospitals established in 1922
Hospitals disestablished in 2002
Redfern, New South Wales